XXXII Brigade, Royal Field Artillery was a brigade of the Royal Field Artillery which served in the First World War.

It was originally formed with 27th, 134th and 135th Batteries, and attached to 4th Infantry Division. In August 1914 it mobilised and was sent to the Continent with the British Expeditionary Force, where it saw service with 2nd Division throughout the war. A howitzer battery was formed in May 1916, from a section of each of 86th (Howitzer) and 128th (Howitzer) Batteries, and designated D Battery; it was disbanded in January 1917, and replaced by 86th (Howitzer) Battery.

Notes

References

External links
Royal Field Artillery Brigades
4th Division Order of Battle

Royal Field Artillery brigades
Artillery units and formations of World War I